Parliamentary elections were held in Czechoslovakia on 12 June 1960. Voters were presented with a single list from the National Front, dominated by the Communist Party of Czechoslovakia (KSČ). According to official figures, 99.7 percent of eligible voters turned out to vote, and 99.9 percent of those who voted approved the National Front list. Within the Front, the Communists had a large majority of 216 seats–147 for the main party and 69 for the Slovak branch.

Non-Communist members appeared on the National Front list in order to keep up the appearance of pluralism. However, seats were allocated in accordance with a set percentage, and no party could take part in the political process without KSČ approval.

These was the last elections held under the partly liberal democratic Ninth-of-May Constitution. A month after the elections, the new National Assembly approved a new constitution that proclaimed "socialism has won" in Czechoslovakia, and changed the country's official name to the Czechoslovak Socialist Republic.

Results

References

Czechoslovakia
Single-candidate elections
Czechoslovakia
Elections in Communist Czechoslovakia
Parliamnentary